Afrodryas leda, the autumn leaf vagrant or orange-and-lemon, is a butterfly of the family Pieridae. It is found throughout Africa.

The wingspan is 50–55 mm for males and 48–56 mm for females. Adults are on the wing year-round in warmer areas with peaks in late summer and autumn.

The larvae feed on Capparis tomentosa.

References

Seitz, A. Die Gross-Schmetterlinge der Erde 13: Die Afrikanischen Tagfalter. Plate XIII 15 as cygnophila
Seitz, A. Die Gross-Schmetterlinge der Erde 13: Die Afrikanischen Tagfalter. Plate XIII 21

Butterflies described in 1847
Teracolini